United States gubernatorial elections were held 7 November 1972 in 18 states and two territories, concurrent with the House, Senate elections and presidential election.

Gubernatorial elections were also held in Iowa, Kansas, South Dakota, and Texas. In these states, they were the last elections on a two-year cycle, before switching to a four-year term for governors (see 1970 United States gubernatorial elections for more information).

Arkansas 
In Arkansas, Dale Bumpers was re-elected to another two-year term in a landslide. Arkansas had two-year terms for governors until 1984, when the state switched to four-year terms for governors with Amendment 63.

Delaware and Illinois 
In Delaware and Illinois, Republicans Russell W. Peterson and Richard B. Ogilvie were defeated by Democrats Sherman Willard Tribbitt and Dan Walker, respectively.

Indiana 
Indiana changed the rules so that governors could serve two back-to-back four-year terms in 1972, but the amendment didn't take place until November 1972. This ruling in effect said that Edgar Whitcomb was not eligible for another term.

Iowa 
In Iowa, Republican incumbent governor Robert D. Ray won a third two-year term, defeating Democratic challenger Paul Franzenburg, whom Ray had defeated for governor four years earlier.  This was the last gubernatorial election in Iowa where the winner served a two-year term; starting with the 1974 election, governors would serve a four-year term.

Kansas 
In Kansas, incumbent governor Robert Docking won a fourth two-year term.  Beginning with the 1974 election, governors in Kansas would serve a four-year term.

Missouri 
In Missouri, during Governor Warren Hearnes' term, the rules were changed so that governors were allowed two back-to-back four-year terms. By the 1972 race, Hearnes had served two terms and was term-limited.

Montana 
In Montana, a new state constitution in 1972 allowed unlimited four-year terms for a governor. Anderson did not run for another term because of health issues, and this bad health was considered the motive behind his suicide in 1989.

North Carolina 
In North Carolina, governors weren't allowed two consecutive terms in a row until 1977, thus term-limiting Scott.

Rhode Island 
In Rhode Island, governors served two-year terms until 1994, when the state switched to four-year terms for governors.

Texas 
In Texas, the defeat of Smith has been considered a casualty of the Sharpstown Scandal.
Texas also had a system of governors serving two-year terms until 1974, when the state switched to four-year terms.

Results

See also
1972 United States elections
1972 United States presidential election
1972 United States Senate elections
1972 United States House of Representatives elections

References

 
November 1972 events in the United States